Erling Persson (21 January 1917 – 28 October 2002) was the founder of H&M (Hennes & Mauritz). He got the idea following a post-World War II trip to the United States: He was impressed by the country's efficient, high-volume stores.

He established the company in Västerås, Sweden, in 1947 selling women's clothing, calling it Hennes, Swedish for "hers." In 1968, Persson acquired the premises and inventory of a Stockholm hunting equipment store named Mauritz Widforss.
In 1982, his son, Stefan Persson took over as the managing director, and today is the chairman of the board. The Persson family owns about 47% of the company and has a 74% voting rights.

References

1917 births
2002 deaths
Swedish businesspeople in fashion
People from Borlänge Municipality
Erling